Carrie Furnace is a former blast furnace located along the Monongahela River in the Pittsburgh area industrial town of Swissvale, Pennsylvania, and it had formed a part of the Homestead Steel Works. The Carrie Furnaces were built in 1884 and they operated until 1982. During its peak, the site produced 1,000 to 1,250 tons of iron per day. All that is left of the site are furnaces #6 and #7, which operated from 1907 to 1978, and its hot metal bridge (not to be confused with the Hot Metal Bridge farther downstream). The furnaces, designated a National Historic Landmark in 2006, are among the only pre-World War II 20th century blast furnaces to survive.

The site is currently managed by the nonprofit Rivers of Steel Heritage Corporation, which conducts tours and other programs from May through October.

History, topography, and environmental concerns

The timeline below portrays the history of Carrie Furnace. Carrie Furnace is located along the Monongahela River, with 135 acres located on the north bank of the river and 33 acres on the south bank. The site, however, is not readily accessible as it is enclosed by railroad tracks. The surrounding areas include Braddock, Rankin, Swissvale, Whitaker, and Munhall. After the Park Corporation purchased the site from U.S. Steel in 1988, both parties agreed to address the environmental concerns. In 2005, Allegheny County purchased the land from Park Corps. for $5.75 million. Underground fuel storage tanks were removed in 1994 along with two above ground fuel storage units. In addition, asbestos from the buildings was removed. The soil was contaminated with PCBs and sulfates. Environmental assessment of the site has been conducted in two phases. The first phase was completed in 2007 and the second is currently underway.

 1881 Carrie Furnace is built
 1892 Homestead Strike
 1898 Site purchased by Andrew Carnegie
 1901 Incorporated into U.S. Steel
 1978 Shutdown
 1988 Sold to Park Corporation
 2005 Sold to Allegheny County for $5.75 million
 2006 Furnaces 6 and 7 were designated a National Historic Landmark

Future development
Partners in the redevelopment of Carrie Furnace include Allegheny County, several nearby municipalities, and the Steel Industry Heritage Corporation. These organizations seek to preserve the remaining industrial structures while utilizing the site for economic development.  The redevelopment plan is mixed-use as it contains plans for commercial and residential development, as well as light industrial manufacturing. Housing, office buildings, a hotel, a conference center, transportation center, and a museum are included in the plan. For example, the hot metal rail bridge that connected Carrie Furnace to Homestead Works is to be converted into an automobile bridge, which will allow access to the site. The bridge also connects the site to The Waterfront – a retail development across the Monongahela River. Additionally, the Rivers of Steel Heritage Corp. is working with Allegheny County on establishing a museum about the history of steel centered on the two blast furnaces still standing on the site.

See also
 Carrie Furnace Hot Metal Bridge

References

External links

 
Travel Channel video 1
Travel Channel video 2
 Big Steel Photographs - B&W Photos of the Carrie Furnace
 Library of Congress Archival Photos of Carrie Furnaces
 Flickr Carrie Furnace Group
 Post Gazette article
 Post Gazette Tour

Ironworks and steel mills in Pennsylvania
Industrial buildings and structures in Pennsylvania
Industrial buildings and structures on the National Register of Historic Places in Pennsylvania
Buildings and structures in Allegheny County, Pennsylvania
Tourist attractions in Allegheny County, Pennsylvania
Industrial buildings completed in 1884
Pittsburgh History & Landmarks Foundation Historic Landmarks
National Historic Landmarks in Pennsylvania
Blast furnaces in the United States
Rivers of Steel National Heritage Area
U.S. Steel
Historic districts on the National Register of Historic Places in Pennsylvania
National Register of Historic Places in Allegheny County, Pennsylvania
Pittsburgh Labor History
1884 establishments in Pennsylvania